Rashkin is a Slavic language-influenced Jewish surname of matronymic derivation.  It literally means "Rashke's", where "Rashke" is a Yiddish diminutive form of "Rachel".  The Germanic/Yiddish form of the similar derivation is Rashkes. 

Notable people with this surname include:
Valery Rashkin, Russian politician

See also
Rokhlin
Raskin
Rashkind

Yiddish-language surnames
Matronymic surnames